Palak is a given name. Notable people with the name include:

 Palak Muchhal (born 1992), Indian playback singer
 Palak Jain, Indian television actress known for roles in television programmes such as Sunaina- Mera Sapna Sach Hua and Veer Shivaji
 Palak Lalwani (born 1998), Indian actress who acts in Telugu and Tamil-language films